A one percenter (1%er) is a statistic kept in Australian rules football, and relates to a variety of actions which benefit the team, but are infrequent or defensive.

History
It has been standard for a long time for a coach to tell his team to "keep doing the one percenters," and this essentially meant that players should keep applying pressure on opponents, by doing the little extra efforts which make turnovers more likely. They have always been seen as the "little extra effort" which went unrewarded on the statistics, and they received the name "one percenter" to represent this. They may not individually affect the outcome of the game, but collectively they can, hence they are regarded as a percentage of the overall performance of the team.  Coaches have always liked to see their teams put in the effort and get plenty of one percenters, and the captains and spiritual leaders of teams are most often skilful players with the most one percenters. At the beginning of the 21st century, one percenters were officially recognised as a statistic. In 2007, the AFL Army Award was struck to reward, among other defensive skills, one percenters.

Definition

There are four actions which constitute a one percenter according to official AFL statistics: knock-ons, spoils, smothers, and shepherds.

Spoil
A spoil is preventing an opposition player from taking clean possession of a pass from a team-mate. This is most usually done by punching the ball away from the contest. In the 2011 semi-final against Sydney, Hawthorn defender Josh Gibson compiled an AFL record 21 spoils.

Knock-ons
A knock-on is using the hand, either clenched or open, to tap the ball to the advantage of a team-mate, without ever taking possession of the football (except out of the ruck). It has the same advantage as a quick handpass or kick, but is not recognised as a disposal because the player never has possession.

Smother
A smother is the act of using the arms or body to get in the way of an opponent's kick, as it leaves the player's boot. A player who smothers the ball is generally seen diving across in front of the kicking player, hoping to trap the ball as it is kicked. Smothers sometimes lead to turn-overs, but not always.

Shepherd

A shepherd is the legal act of preventing an opponent from obtaining the ball or tackling a team-mate.

Other one percenters

There are other defensive efforts and supporting actions which are not statistically recognised as one percenters. However, when coaches refer to one percenters, these actions are often also considered.

Chase
A chase is the act of making a long pursuit behind an opponent who is running with and bouncing the ball, even if he never catches up and tackles his opponent. A chase puts pressure on the opponent to kick while running quickly and/or while unstable, decreasing the likely accuracy of the kick. Hence, coaches will consider a chase to be a one percenter.

Hurry
Hurrying (or corralling) an opponent is the act of putting them off balance without laying a tackle, while he is taking his kick or handpass. Like the chase, this increases the likelihood of a turnover, and is often considered to be a one percenter.

Bump

A bump or hip and shoulder is the act of using the side of the body and running into an opponent with force - under some circumstances. The bump is a type of strong shepherd, but players can also legally bump their opponents out of the way as they run to collect the ball. A bump to an opponent is legal, provided the bump does not ride high and contact an opponent's head. A bump in the back is illegal under the "push in the back".

Block
A block or screen is a more subtle way to shepherd in a marking contest, and while it is often technically illegal, it will almost never be penalised. The most common way to block is to run between a leading forward and his pursuing opponent, slowing down the defender so that the forward will take his mark uncontested.

References

External links
Checking Skills - from the International Australian Football Council

Australian rules football records and statistics
Australian rules football terminology
Australian rules football tactics
Australian rules football skills